Posta is a  (municipality) in the Province of Rieti in the Italian region of Latium, located about  northeast of Rome and about  northeast of Rieti.

The municipality of Posta contains the frazioni (subdivisions, mainly villages and hamlets) Bacugno, Favischio, Figino, Fontarello, Picciame, Sigillo, Steccato and Villa Camponeschi.

Posta borders the following municipalities: Borbona, Cittareale, Leonessa, Micigliano, Montereale.

Demographic evolution

References

Cities and towns in Lazio